Tokyo West International School is an international kindergarten, elementary and middle school in Hachioji (Western Tokyo), Japan.

History
The school was established in April 2010 in the city of Hachioji by Yoshinori Kato. Its creation arose from the need to cater for students graduating from Kunitachi Kids International School, in Kunitachi, Tokyo.

The first campus was in Shibazaki. There were 12 students in the first elementary class. The following year, the campus moved to Sunagawa, and added the 2nd and 3rd grades to the school's elementary division. In 2013, the Sunagawa campus was moved to Hachioji, the 3rd, 4th and 5th grade classes were moved there while the new main building was under construction. In 2014, all the elementary school students moved to Hachioji campus. Then 2015, all Tokyo West International School students moved to the new Hachioji main campus.

The school is composed of a kindergarten, an elementary school and a middle school : 12 classes spanning from K-2 to Grade 9. The staff is composed of 20 homeroom teachers and 8 specialist teachers (Japanese, Music and Physical Education).

Facilities
The school's facilities currently include 12 classrooms, a library, a science room, a music room, an outdoor swimming pool, an artificial turf field, an tent gym as well as a small netted rooftop.

Accreditation
Tokyo West International School is accredited by the AdvancED and attempted to gain accreditation from the WASC (Western Association of Schools and Colleges) accreditation procedure.

References

External links
 Tokyo West International School website
 Hachioji City's website

International schools in Tokyo
High schools in Tokyo
American international schools in Japan
Educational institutions established in 2010
Elementary schools in Japan
2010 establishments in Japan
Hachiōji, Tokyo